Moore Gwillim (died 1611), of Monmouth and Rockfield, Monmouthshire, was a Welsh politician.

He was a Member (MP) of the Parliament of England for Monmouth Boroughs in 1584 and 1586.

References

16th-century births
1611 deaths
16th-century Welsh politicians
People from Monmouth, Wales
Members of the Parliament of England (pre-1707) for constituencies in Wales